Daddy's Highway is the 1987 debut album by New Zealand indie rock group the Bats.

Recording and release
By 1986, the Bats had released three critically acclaimed EPs, but still had not released a full-length album. While touring in the U.K. that year, an acquaintance in Glasgow offered the use of his home 8 track studio. Half of the tracks for what would become Daddy's Highway were recorded there.

Upon their return to New Zealand, recording was completed at Nightshift in Christchurch, and the album was released by Flying Nun in 1987. "Block of Wood" was released as a 7-inch vinyl single.

Reception
Daddy's Highway is the Bats' most highly regarded album, and has been named one of the best New Zealand albums of the 1980s. In 2000, it placed No. 88 in Rip It Up magazine's list of New Zealand's Top 100 Albums of All Time. Notable tracks on the album include "North by North", "Tragedy" and the lead single, "Block of Wood", all of which were staples on New Zealand student radio.

Reissues
The compact disc release swapped the order of sides one and two of the LP and added five bonus tracks: "Calm Before the Storm" and "Candidate", which were the B-sides to the "Block of Wood" single; and "Mad on You", "Trouble in This Town" and "Made Up in Blue", which constituted the band's Made Up in Blue EP.

In October 2010, Flying Nun reissued Daddy's Highway. The album was remastered by Paul Kean, and the same five bonus tracks were added.

Track listing
All songs written by Robert Scott.

Original LP
Side one
"Block of Wood" – 3:12
"Miss These Things" – 3:07
"Mid City Team" – 2:25
"Some Peace Tonight" – 2:53
"Had to Be You" – 3:03
"Daddy's Highway" – 4:00

Side two
"Treason" – 2:55
"Sir Queen" – 3:25
"Round and Down" – 2:18
"Take It" – 2:30
"North by North" – 4:08
"Tragedy" – 3:00

CD releases swap sides one and two and add five bonus tracks

"Calm Before the Storm" – 2:55
"Candidate" – 3:25
"Mad on You" – 2:18
"Trouble in This Town" – 2:30
"Made Up in Blue" – 4:08

Personnel
The Bats
Robert Scott – lead vocals, guitars
Kaye Woodward – vocals, guitars; organ ("Tragedy"); bass guitar ("Block of Wood", "Had to Be You")
Paul Kean – vocals, bass guitar; organ ("Daddy's Highway"); guitars ("Block of Wood", "Had to Be You")
Malcolm Grant – drums; drum machine ("Mid City Team")

Additional musician
Alastair Galbraith – violin ("Treason", "Sir Queen", "North by North")

Technical
Paul Kean – engineer, mixing
Callum MacLean – assistant engineer (side one, tracks 2–5)
Rob Pinder – engineer (side one, tracks 1, 6; side two, tracks 7–12)
Arnold Von Bussell – engineer (side one, tracks 1, 6; side two, tracks 7–12)
Malcolm Grant – sleeve, Polaroids

References

The Bats (New Zealand band) albums
1987 debut albums
Flying Nun Records albums
Dunedin Sound albums